Mauricio Asenjo (born 23 July 1994) is an Argentine footballer who plays as a forward for Club Agropecuario Argentino of Primera Nacional.

Career

Seoul E-Land FC
Asenjo joined Seoul E-Land FC in February 6th 2022.

He scored his first goal in the club at an away match against Gimpo FC held in March 12.

He left the club at the end of the season.

External links

References

1994 births
Living people
Association football forwards
Argentine footballers
Argentine Primera División players
Argentine expatriate footballers
Argentine sportspeople of Chilean descent
Primera Nacional players
K League 2 players
Club Atlético Banfield footballers
Club Atlético Brown footballers
Gimnasia y Esgrima de Jujuy footballers
Independiente Rivadavia footballers
Nueva Chicago footballers
Seoul E-Land FC players
Club Agropecuario Argentino players
Expatriate footballers in South Korea
Argentine expatriate sportspeople in South Korea